Brian Goudie (born November 9, 1972) is a Canadian former professional ice hockey defenceman/enforcer and coach.

Goudie played major junior hockey in the Ontario Hockey League with the Sault Ste. Marie Greyhounds before starting his professional career with the Hampton Roads Admirals midway through the 1992–93 ECHL season. He went on to play 16 seasons of professional hockey, including parts of 11 seasons in the East Coast Hockey League where he racked up 266 points and 2,253 penalty minutes in 598 games played.

Gouldie was an enforcer who was a central figure in the January 7, 1994 "Greensboro Brawl" during which 249 penalty minutes were given after just the first two seconds of play. During the 1995–96 ECHL season, Gouldie was suspended for eight games after he fired a puck at a linesman in the closing seconds of a game.

When Gouldie left the ECHL following the 2002–03 season, he held the ECHL record for most career penalty minutes (since surpassed by Cam Brown), and was ranked third on the league's list of all-time games played.

Following the 2006–07 season, in which Goudie was awarded the SPHL Defenseman of the Year and was named to the SPHL First All-Star Team, Gouldie hung up his skates to serve two seasons as head coach of the Richmond Renegades (SPHL).

Awards and honours

References

External links

1972 births
Living people
Baltimore Bandits players
Canadian ice hockey coaches
Canadian ice hockey defencemen
Florida Everblades players
Hamilton Canucks players
Hampton Roads Admirals players
Houston Aeros (1994–2013) players
Ice hockey people from Manitoba
Moncton Hawks players
Pee Dee Pride players
People from The Pas
Portland Pirates players
Providence Bruins players
Richmond Renegades players
Richmond Renegades (SPHL) players
Richmond RiverDogs players
Sault Ste. Marie Greyhounds players
Springfield Falcons players
Utah Grizzlies (IHL) players
San Jose Rhinos players
Canadian expatriate ice hockey players in the United States